Stranded in Paradise: New Zealand Rock'n'Roll, 1955-1988 is a book by John Dix. It has been described as It was the first proper history of New Zealand rock and roll. It was originally published in 1988. It was published by Paradise Publications in 1988. How New Zealand's culture has developed is also described in the book. Early Māori music is also addressed in the book. Acts such as Dragon, Split Enz, Bruno Lawrence, and Hello Sailor are covered in the book.

Other editions
The updated 2005 edition is called Stranded In Paradise: New Zealand Rock And Roll, 1955 to The Modern Era.

References

New Zealand books
New Zealand music